Agvaantserengiin Enkhtaivan (born 1958) is a Mongolian music composer and film maker who studied in Russia. He is the director of the film A Pearl in the Forest.

In 1990, he became famous in Mongolia by being selected to play the lead role of Temüjin (Genghis Khan) in the Mongolian film, Under The Eternal Blue Sky, directed by Baljinnyam.

Awards 
 Meritorious Artist (УГЗ)
 People's Artist of Mongolia

Filmography
2003 Khan Khentii Mountain (documentary)
2004 The children of Ghenggis Khan (documentary)
2008 A Pearl in the Forest (film)
2012 The Sky Son (film)

Discography
Melodies of Mongolia, volume 1
Melodies of Mongolia, volume 2
Melodies of Mongolia, volume 3
Melodies of Mongolia, volume 4
Original soundtrack for the feature film "A Pearl in the Forest (Moilkhon)"

References 

1958 births
Living people
Mongolian film directors
Mongolian composers
20th-century composers
21st-century composers
20th-century male musicians
21st-century male musicians
Male composers
People's Artists of Mongolia